As an adjective, Atlantean (or Atlantian) means "of or pertaining to Atlas or Atlantis".

Atlantean may also refer to:

 Atlantean figures, a type of ancient artifacts
 Atlantean (documentary series), a trilogy of TV films discussing the origins of the European coastal peoples
 Atlanteans (Marvel Comics), a fictional species in the Marvel Universe
 Atlanteans (DC Comics), a fictional species in the DC Universe
 Leyland Atlantean, a model of double-decker bus
 Atlantean language, a constructed language created for Disney's film Atlantis: The Lost Empire
 Atlantean Scion, a fictional device in the game Tomb Raider
 Ancient (Stargate), a race in the Stargate universe, also known as Atlanteans or Lanteans

See also
 Atlantan, an inhabitant of Atlanta